Rafael Emilio Valdez Díaz (born December 17, 1967) is a former Major League Baseball pitcher.

Career
Valdez began his professional career as a shortstop, playing two seasons at that position with the Charleston Rainbows in 1986–87. In , Valdez pitched a perfect game for the Riverside Red Wave.

After his major league career, Valdez continued to pitch in minor league baseball until , when he played for the Allentown Ambassadors of the Northeast League.

Notes

External links 

1967 births
Living people
People from Nizao
Allentown Ambassadors players
Albany-Colonie Diamond Dogs players
Albany Diamond Dogs players
Baseball shortstops
Canton-Akron Indians players
Dominican Republic expatriate baseball players in the United States

Major League Baseball pitchers
Major League Baseball players from the Dominican Republic
San Diego Padres players
Broncos de Reynosa players
Dominican Republic expatriate baseball players in Mexico
Charleston Rainbows players
Las Vegas Stars (baseball) players
Leones de Yucatán players
Mercuries Tigers players
Dominican Republic expatriate baseball players in Taiwan
Riverside Red Wave players
Spokane Indians players
Wichita Wranglers players